Battlefield Earth: A Saga of the Year 3000 is a 1982 science fiction novel written by L. Ron Hubbard, founder of Scientology. He also composed a soundtrack to the book called Space Jazz.

Plot 

In the year 3000, Earth has been ruled by an alien race, the Psychlos, for a millennium. The Psychlos discovered a deep space probe (suggested to be Voyager 1) with directions and pictures mounted on it and the precious material, gold, that led them straight to Earth.

After one thousand years, humanity is an endangered species numbering fewer than 35,000 and reduced to a few tribes in isolated parts of the world while the Psychlos strip the planet of its mineral wealth. Jonnie Goodboy Tyler, a young man in one such tribe, lives in the shadow of the Rocky Mountains. Depressed by the recent death of his father and both the lethargy and sickness of most of the surviving adults in his tribe, later determined to be caused by radiation-leakage from decaying nuclear land-mines, he leaves his village to explore the lowlands and to disprove the superstitions long held by his people of monsters in those areas. He is soon captured in the ruins of Denver by Terl, the Psychlo chief of planetary security.

They originate from Psychlo, a planet with an atmosphere radically different from Earth, located in another universe with a different set of elements. Their "breathe-gas" explodes on contact with even trace amounts of radioactive material, such as uranium. The Psychlos have been the dominant species across multiple universes for at least 100,000 years. It becomes apparent in the later chapters that the Psychlos were originally non-violent miners but were subjugated by a ruling class called "Catrists" to become malicious, sadistic sociopaths.

Terl has been assigned to Earth, and his term has been arbitrarily extended by Numph, the planetary head of mining operations. Fearful at the thought of spending several more years on Earth, Terl decides to make himself a multi-millionaire to escape, by secretly mining a lode of gold in the Rocky Mountains that his planetary scanner drones have recently found. It is surrounded by uranium deposits that make Psychlo mining impossible, so Terl decides to capture a Man-Animal to mine the gold for him.

Terl forces Jonnie to submit to a learning machine programmed by a servile race that was exterminated centuries earlier for going on strike. It quickly teaches him numerous subjects, including the Psychlo language, by implanting the information directly into Jonnie's brain.

Looking for leverage against Jonnie, Terl captures his childhood-love Chrissie and her sister, Pattie, who went searching for Jonnie a year after he left their clan, and holds them hostage to ensure his continued cooperation. Thereafter, Jonnie is free to move around the mining area. Terl and Jonnie travel to Scotland where Jonnie recruits eighty-three Scottish people to help with the mining, including several deliberately selected body-doubles for Jonnie, older women to perform the cooking and clothes mending, a doctor, a teacher, and a historian. Jonnie tells the Scots about the evil deeds of Terl, to include how he has imprisoned Jonnie's love and her little sister. Led by Robert the Fox, the Scots agree to help him fight against the Psychlo rule on Earth and rescue Chrissie and Pattie. Terl does not understand English, and is instead convinced that the Scots are motivated by a promise of pay on project completion.

While Jonnie and his Scottish allies mine the gold deposit, they also secretly explore the ruins of humanity to look for uranium that can be weaponized for use against their Psychlo oppressors. This subterfuge is aided by the aforementioned body-doubles, making it appear to Terl's surveillance that the mining operation is the sole priority of the human contingent. Meanwhile, Terl finally gains leverage on Numph, discovering that he has been stealing company funds. Terl blackmails him, effectively negating Numph's power over him, allowing Terl to continue with his mining plans. 

Terl has been busy obfuscating the purpose of the gold-mining operation and implementing his plan to ship the human-mined gold back to the Psychlo home-planet. Terl's plan involves replacing lead coffin-lids with lead-plated facsimiles made from the gold mined by the Scots, and shipping these coffins with dead Psychlos in them, home. When he finally returned to Psychlo, he could then dig up the coffins and sell the lids to make his fortune. All dead Psychlos are to be returned to home planet for burial, but recent safety measures have reduced accidents. Terl thus has to manufacture accidents to kill Psychlos, and decides to assassinate Numph as well, to get the bodies needed.

During the semi-annual teleportation of personnel, goods, and coffins to Psychlo, Jonnie and his allies co-opt Terl's plan by packing the coffins with "dirty nukes" and "planet busters" they have found, and replacing the golden coffin-lids with the original lead lids. After the last teleportation, the humans use the Psychlos' own weapons against them and gain control of the planet. With humans in control of Earth, Jonnie works to discover the secret of Psychlo mathematics and teleportation. This is a difficult task, compounded by the fact that Psychlo math is based on the number eleven, and Psychlo equations appear to make no sense.

Before the teleportation, Jonnie is forced to oppose a longtime rival from his own clan, Brown Limper Staffor, who is seeking to wrest control of Earth for himself. Unwittingly used by Terl to advance his own plans, Brown Limper nearly succeeds after gaining assistance from a group of cannibalistic mercenaries from southern Africa called the Brigantes, and their leader, General Snith. But Brown Limper is killed by Terl just before the Psychlo's teleportation, and the Brigantes are defeated.

It is discovered that all Psychlos have a deep brain-stimulation device implanted in their brains to make them controllable. Meant to make work pleasant for them, the device promotes extreme sadism in the males, causing them to attack any non-Psychlo who shows interest in Psychlo mathematics and teleportation. If the Psychlos are unsuccessful in killing their intended victims, the device compels them to commit suicide. The removal of this device frees the handful of remaining Psychlos on Earth from its effects. Curiously, Ker did not have any such device implanted in his brain. 

With the Earth being threatened by other alien races looking for restitution because they had suffered under the harsh rule of the Psychlos, Jonnie opposes a race of intergalactic bankers seeking to repossess the Earth for unpaid debts. The security and independence of humanity once again threatened, Jonnie redoubles his efforts to figure out Psychlo teleportation. 

It is eventually discovered that the dirty nukes sent with the intent of destroying the capital city on Psychlo instead started a chain reaction which reached into the planet's core due to over-mining, causing the planet to explode and transform into a star. Jonnie also discovers that other Psychlo facilities scattered about the multiple universes were destroyed by their own reliance on teleportation as they performed their scheduled teleportation shipments, and instead, brought back radioactive solar matter. This holocaust killed every single Psychlo in the multiple universes except for the handful remaining on Earth. Once it is revealed that all female Psychlos who leave the homeworld are sterilized to prevent off-world births, Johnny realizes that the Psychlos on Earth will not be able to reproduce, and eventually, the Psychlo race will become extinct. 

Jonnie then works out a way to prevent the repossession of Earth via contracts Terl had signed with Brown Limper Staffor. The Psychlo had thought that it would be amusing to make Staffor believe that he was the legal owner of Earth as well as all Psychlo possessions across the multiple universes, by signing a contract that stated as much before his final teleportation to Planet Psychlo. Terl had no way of knowing that he was about to die, along with almost his entire race, with the destruction of his homeworld. Once planet Psychlo was destroyed, Terl was the highest ranking member of the Intergalactic Mining Company left alive, and his signature on Staffor's contract became legal. That meant that Jonnie, as the recognized leader of Earth with the death of Brown Limper, now owned what was left of the entire Psychlo empire. Using these contracts, the Earth Planetary Bank pays off all debts to the intergalactic bankers.

However, Jonnie is still perplexed by Psychlo mathematics. With the help of an aged Psychlo engineer, he learns about Psychlos using a cipher system and dummy equations to make their mathematics unsolvable. At the same time, he also discovers how the Psychlos protected their teleportation technology in their local equipment, and records the circuits for future use. Using the existing teleportation console, Jonnie is able to bring back breathe-gas from a planet in the Psychlo star system that was never officially recorded. With the Psychlo math and the circuits, Earth begins to manufacture teleportation equipment, sold to numerous planetary systems via the intergalactic bankers. At the same time, Jonnie uses the Earth's newly acquired wealth to buy impenetrable force fields and automated orbiting defense platforms to protect the Earth from future threats. 

With the Earth secure and the human population growing and learning about its true history, Jonnie gives ownership of the Earth back to its people. A few years later, Jonnie and Chrissie are married and they have a son and a daughter. With human civilization being rebuilt and thriving, Jonnie and Chrissie take their children and leave for an isolated part of the world to train them in the old ways of survival, and to live out the rest of their lives in peace. But, after a year, their friends find them and implore them to return to civilization, which Jonnie reluctantly agrees to.

Years later, frustrated with un-ending fame and life away from nature, a middle-aged Jonnie takes some supplies and quietly slips away to the Rocky Mountains, never to be seen again. He becomes a figure of legend.

Publishing history 
Initially titled "Man, the Endangered Species", Battlefield Earth was first published in 1982 by St. Martin's Press, though all subsequent reprintings have been by Church of Scientology publishing companies Bridge Publications and Galaxy Press. Written in the style of the pulp fiction era (during which Hubbard began his writing career), the novel is a massive work (over 750 pages in hardcover, 1000+ in paperback). It was Hubbard's first science fiction novel since his pulp magazine days of the 1940s, and it was promoted as Hubbard's return to science fiction after a long hiatus.

The cover artwork of the original hardcover edition featured an image of hero Jonnie Goodboy Tyler which did not coincide with the physical description given in the novel. The subsequent paperback release corrected the cover art, most notably by giving Tyler a beard.

The book was reissued in 2000 with a new cover, in connection with the release of the film adaptation. The book has also been released in audiobook and e-book versions.

According to Nielsen BookScan, Battlefield Earth sold 29,000 copies between 2001 and 2005.

Hubbard is also credited with writing the accompanying music, which was released as Space Jazz; Chick Corea and Stanley Clarke are some of the Scientology notables playing on the album, of which The Vinyl Factory Amar reviewer Ediriwira said, "if this isn't one of jazz's worst, it's certainly its craziest".

Critical response 
Battlefield Earth received polarized mixed reviews, with some critics, and readers, considering the book Hubbard's most enjoyable sci-fi work and a classic of the genre, while others consider it to be genuinely terrible. The book had a negative reception from some literary critics: The Economist, for instance, called Battlefield Earth "an unsubtle saga, atrociously written, windy and out of control" while in the science fiction magazine Analog, Thomas Easton criticized it as "a wish-fulfillment fantasy wholly populated by the most one-dimensional of cardboard characters." Other critics pointed to the book's slipshod writing, such as "the ineffably klutzy destruction of the planet of the evil Psychlos by atomic bombs, which turns it into a 'radioactive sun. Punch sarcastically commended Hubbard's "excellent understanding of evil impulses, particularly deviousness, which helps with the plot, and [he] is well-enough aware of his weaknesses not to dwell upon frailties like love, generosity, compassion". David Langford, after criticizing the plot, style and scientific implausibilities, concluded: "From this, Battlefield may sound almost worth looking at for its sheer laughable badness. No. It's dreadful and tedious beyond endurance".

Neil Gaiman reviewed Battlefield Earth for Imagine magazine, and stated that "over 1000 pages of thrills, spills, vicious aliens, noble humans. Is mankind an endangered species? Will handsome and heroic Jonny Goodboy Tyler win Earth back from the nine-foot-high Psychlos? A tribute to the days of Pulp, I found it un-put-downable."

Other critics praised the novel, however. The Magazine of Fantasy & Science Fiction described the book as a "rather good, fast-paced, often fascinating SF adventure yarn". In a 2007 Fox News interview, former U.S. presidential candidate and former Massachusetts governor Mitt Romney pointed to the book as "a very fun science fiction book."

The Church of Scientology's role 
Shortly after its release, Battlefield Earth rose to the top of The New York Times Best Seller list and also those of the Los Angeles Times, Time, United Press International, Associated Press, B. Dalton and Waldenbooks. According to Hubbard's literary agents, Author Services Inc., by June 1983 the book had sold 150,000 copies and earned $1.5 million.

Not long afterwards, stories emerged of a reported Church of Scientology book-buying campaign mounted to ensure that the book would appear on the bestseller lists. According to newspaper reports, Church representatives promised the publishers that a particular number of copies would be bought by Church subsidiaries (the author and journalist Russell Miller cites a figure of 50,000 hardback copies.).

Local churches of Scientology and individual Scientologists were reportedly also urged to buy copies of the book. Bookstore chains including Waldenbooks cited examples of Scientologists repeatedly coming into stores and buying armfuls of the book at a time. Several bookstores reported that shipments of the book arrived with the store's own price tags already affixed to them, even before they were unpacked from the shipping boxes, suggesting that copies were being recycled. According to Miller, Scientologists throughout the United States were instructed to go out and buy at least two or three copies each. Gerry Armstrong, who worked in the Church's archives at the time, states that "One of the wealthy Scientologists, by the name of Ellie Bolger, apparently paid a huge amount of money to the organization, which they then disbursed to staff members to go down to B. Dalton or whatever and buy the book". The New York Times reported that "two Scientology organizations bought a total of 30,000 copies of Battlefield Earth at discount directly from the publisher, apparently to sell or to give to current or prospective Scientology members". Booksellers told the newspaper that they had seen unusual purchasing patterns, including individuals buying as many as 800 copies of the book at a time. It was suggested that "church members could be trying to buy themselves a bestseller in order to obtain a large paperback or movie sale, both of which are often contingent on a book's first becoming a bestseller in hard cover." Two months after the reports emerged, Author Services Inc. announced that it had sold the film rights for Battlefield Earth to a Los Angeles production company, though it took another 16 years for the film to be made.

Former Scientologist Bent Corydon has described how pressure was put on the managers of Scientology "missions" – effectively franchises – to promote and purchase Battlefield Earth. At a conference held in San Francisco on October 17, 1982, Scientologist "mission holders" were told by Wendall Reynolds, the Church's international finance dictator, to do their bit to make the book a success:

According to Corydon, "[W]e were ordered to sell 1,000 copies of Hubbard's recently released science-fiction book Battlefield Earth before Thursday or I would be kicked out as mission holder". The idea behind the publicity drive was said to be that it "would, in turn, get the Dianetics book selling"; Dianetics: The Modern Science of Mental Health did in fact experience a marked increase in sales subsequently, reentering The New York Times Best Seller list four times in 1986. Battlefield Earth, for its part, sold over 125,000 copies in its first print run and by March 1985 had sold 800,000 paperback copies.

Hubbard's role as the founder of Scientology has led to a long-running controversy about whether Battlefield Earth contains Scientology themes, and about the role that the Church of Scientology has played in publishing and promoting the book.

Hubbard himself denied that the book was a vehicle for Scientology. He described his motives for writing as being that "it keeps my hand in, amuses people and whiles away the otherwise idle hour. It's better than playing video games!" He addresses the question directly in the book's introduction, where he says: "Some of my readers may wonder that I did not include my own serious subjects in this book. It was with no thought of dismissal of them. It was just that I put on my professional writer's hat. I also did not want to give anybody the idea I was doing a press relations job for my other serious works."

Scientology-related themes 
After Hubbard's book Dianetics: The Modern Science of Mental Health was published in 1950, the American Psychological Association passed a resolution stating that the book's claims were not supported by empirical evidence. Subsequently, Hubbard maintained an opposition to psychiatry, a viewpoint the novel reflects by portraying the Psychlos as being ruled by the Catrists ("Psychlo-Catrists" sounding similar to psychiatrists), described as a group of evil charlatans. Those Psychlos who disagree with or oppose the Catrists are subjected to various forms of persecution; particularly, the Catrists use surgical mind control or electroshock in order to maintain their power base. Hubbard frequently claimed in Scientology that psychiatrists used such tactics to maintain their influence and funding. Early in its history, the Psychlo species had no fixed name, instead being named after the Emperor of the day. The word "Psychlo" is revealed to have originally meant "brain" in its language, signifying that the Catrists feel (or in any case claim) that the entire population requires treatment as mental patients.

One supporting character, a Psychlo mathematician named Soth, is described as having been shaped by the views of his mother. She was a member of a resistance group, referred to as a "church", which held religious meetings secretly. This "church", much like the Church of Scientology, opposes psychiatry.

In one passage of the book, a human doctor recalls a "cult" called psychology which existed before the Psychlo invasion, but is "forgotten now".

In December 1980, two months after he completed the book, Hubbard told fellow Scientologists that "I was a bit disgusted with the way the psychologists and brain-surgeons mess people up, so I wrote a fiction story based in part on the consequences that could occur if the shrinks continued to do it".

Film adaptation 

The subsequent film adaptation, released in 2000, was a commercial failure and was criticized as one of the "worst films ever made".
From the book's release, Scientologist and science-fiction fan John Travolta aimed to bring Hubbard's book to the big screen in a series of two movies with himself playing Jonnie Goodboy Tyler, as well as producing. A first film was planned to be released in 1983, but due to rising costs, trouble in finding a studio that would fund the project, and Travolta's waning star power, the project was cancelled. It was finally produced by Franchise Pictures and released in 2000 as Battlefield Earth. Directed by Roger Christian, it stars Travolta (who by now felt he was too old to play the hero) as Terl, Barry Pepper as Jonnie Goodboy Tyler, and Forest Whitaker as Ker.

The film opened to nearly universal negative reviews and was a large box office bomb. Due to bad word of mouth and Internet buzz, it quickly disappeared from theater chains, having grossed $29,725,663 worldwide against a reported $73 million budget. Almost all aspects of the film were criticized: hammy acting (especially by Travolta and Pepper), the film's overuse of Dutch angles, mediocre visual effects, corny dialogue, and several plot inconsistencies. The film received seven Golden Raspberry Awards at the 21st such ceremony, including that for Worst Picture, and it later won two special awards: "Worst Drama of Our [the Razzies'] First 25 Years" and "Worst Picture of the Decade" (2000‒2009), at the 25th and 30th Golden Raspberry Awards respectively. Only Jack and Jill, a 2011 comedy co-written, produced by, and starring Adam Sandler, has won more Raspberries (jointly or solely winning all ten of the awards presented at the 32nd Razzies).

Franchise Pictures was later sued and went bankrupt after the company was discovered to have fraudulently overstated the film's budget. This kept it from following its plans to make a sequel, since the movie covered only the first half of the book. The first Battlefield Earth’s poor reception kept the sequel from hitting its intended 2002 release date, and the collapse of Franchise Pictures made the project even more untenable.

Notes

External links 

Official book website (Galaxy Press)
The Writing of Battlefield Earth (lronhubbard.org)
 (Audio of radio broadcast on NPR.)

1982 American novels
Dystopian novels
Novels by L. Ron Hubbard
Fiction set in the 30th century
American science fiction novels
American novels adapted into films
1982 science fiction novels
Novels about extraterrestrial life
Novels set on fictional planets
Teleportation in fiction